Bulls and bears may refer to:

 Market sentiment, which can be bullish or bearish
 Bull and bear markets
 Bulls and Bears: The Great Wall St. Game, a board game by McLoughlin Brothers